Selekoh is a small town in Bagan Datuk District, Perak, Malaysia. The word Selekoh in Malay Language means "corner".

References 

Bagan Datuk District
Towns in Perak